Tomáš Štítný ze Štítného (c. 1333 – 1401/1409) was a Czech nobleman, writer, theologian, translator, and Christian preacher.

Tomáš Štítný came from a lower nobility from the Štítná fortress (today part of Žirovnice, Czech Republic. He was one of the leading figures of the early Czech Reformation, writing and translating Christian tracts for the benefit of the nobility, to assist in wise governance. The Klementinum Codex, a major work, is a collection of some of the essentials necessary for Christian practice and the needs of daily life. He also wrote parables for ordinary people and works purely for entertainment. There is a bronze bust of Tomas Štítný in the pantheon of the National Museum in Prague.

External links
Reprint from 1852, some of his manuscripts

1333 births
1400s deaths
People from Žirovnice
People from the Kingdom of Bohemia
Czech Roman Catholic theologians
Czech philosophers